The 1984 Winfield State League was the inaugural season of the Queensland Rugby League's statewide competition. The competition was run similarly to the NSWRL's Amco Cup, featuring a short format prior the larger Brisbane Premiership season. The Wynnum Manly Seagulls won their first State League title with a 21-10 win over Souths in the final at Lang Park in Brisbane.

Teams 
A total of 14 teams competed in the inaugural season, 8 of which were BRL Premiership clubs. The remaining six were regional teams from across the state, hence the State League name.

Ladder 
Souths, Wynnum-Manly, North Queensland and Fortitude Valley made the finals from a 7-round season. North Queensland became the first country representative side to make the finals after finishing third on the table.

Source:

Finals 
The finals were straight final four series held at QRL headquarters at Lang Park, with Wynnum-Manly and Souths winning their respective semi finals. In the final, the Seagulls defeated Magpies 21-10 to win the first of four straight Winfield State League titles.

References

Rugby league in Brisbane
Winfield State League season